Julian Reister won the first edition of the event against Dušan Lajović 6–1, 6–7(3–7), 7–6(7–2).

Seeds

Draw

Finals

Top half

Bottom half

References
 Main Draw
 Qualifying Draw

Internationaux de Tennis de BLOIS
2013 Singles